Joseph Shield Nicholson, FBA, FRSE (9 November 1850 – 12 May 1927) was an English economist.

Life
He was born in Wrawby in Lincolnshire on 9 November 1850 the only son of Rev Thomas Nicholson, minister of Banbury, and his wife, Mary Anne Grant. He was educated at Lewisham School in London.

Nicholson studied Logic and Metaphysics at King's College London and the University of Edinburgh, then studied Moral Philosophy at Cambridge, and Heidelberg. He was a private tutor at Cambridge from 1876 to 1880 coming to fame in 1877 when he won the Cambridge Cobden Club prize for his essay "The Effects of Machinery on Wages".

In 1880 he became Professor of political economy at Edinburgh University. At this time he lived at 15 Jordan Lane in the Morningside district. He was the first President of the Scottish Society of Economists, serving from its creation in 1897 until 1903.

In 1884 he was elected a Fellow of the Royal Society of Edinburgh. His proposers were George Chrystal, Alexander Crum Brown, Alexander Buchan and Peter Guthrie Tait.

in 1918, he was awarded the Guy Medal in Silver by the Royal Statistical Society.

In later life he lived at 3 Belford Park near Dean Village in Edinburgh.

Nicholson resigned his chair due to ill health in 1925 and died in Edinburgh on 12 May 1927. He is buried with his wife, Jane (Jeannie) Walmsley Hodgson, in the 20th-century extension to Dean Cemetery, Edinburgh, in the central section.

Works
Nicholson's writings represent a compromise between the methods of the historical school of German economics and those of the English deductive school. In his principal work, Principles of Political Economy (three volumes, 1893–1901), he closely follows John Stuart Mill in his selection of material, but employs statistical and historical discussion, instead of the abstract reasoning from simple assumption that characterises Mill's work.

References

External links

 

 
Portraits of Nicholson (National Portrait Gallery, England)
William Augustus Guy medal
John Shield Nicholson - The University of Sydney

English economists
1850 births
1927 deaths
Alumni of King's College London
Alumni of the University of Edinburgh
Academics of the University of Edinburgh
Fellows of the British Academy